Greatford railway station was a station on the North Island Main Trunk (NIMT) in New Zealand, south of Marton. It is in the Manawatū-Whanganui region. Only a substation and a passing loop remain.

History

Opening 
Special trains ran from Halcombe and from Palmerston North to Marton in April 1878. On 20 May 1878 the Halcombe to Greatford section opened, as the final link between the ports of Foxton and Whanganui. In 1878 it was noted that the loading stage was built to allow a Fairlie engine to pass. The line was initially worked by these E and R Class engines, which were considered to be running fast when reaching  and averaging .

The line became part of the NIMT, when it fully opened in 1909, and Greatford was one of the stopping points for Wellington to New Plymouth expresses in 1910 and in the 1940s.

Move 
The move, which had been planned in 1915, was associated with work starting in 1935, and for which £4,989 was funded in 1938, to ease the gradient and curve on the bank between Greatford and Kakariki to 1 in 70. The realigned curve opened in March 1939 and eliminated two level crossings.

Traffic 

Greatford had its annual returns of traffic recorded, as did Marton to the north and Halcombe to the south. In 1912 the station sold 6,258 tickets. By 1923 that had declined to 4,613 passengers, but it still had 22,165 sheep and pigs arriving at the station. In 1950 passenger numbers were down to 2,968. However, in the early days, traffic was such that, in 1897, a Mrs Wolferston asked for authority to supply tea, coffee, and refreshments at the station. In the 1920s the station was staffed at grade 7 by a stationmaster and clerk.

Greatford village 
Although the village only had a small population (81 in 1886, 132 in 1901, 135 in 2018), the station also served large estates, such as those of former prime minister, William Fox, at Westoe (listed as a Category 1 Historic Place on 29 November 1985) and of William Jarvis Willis at Woodendean. St Martin's Anglican Church was the first building designed by Frederick de Jersey Clere, on land that had been part of Woodendean. It has had a Category 2 listing since 2 April 2004.

Bulls and proposed Levin to Greatford railway 
The station was also the railhead for Bulls. Planned rail links to Bulls were never built. A  branch line was considered in 1879, but rejected in 1880. In 1914 a  branch was authorised. It isn't clear if this was the gravel pit siding, eventually built, or whether, as suggested at the time, it was to be a link to the Sanson tramway. That proposal had been made in 1892, was rejected in 1916, and made again in 1937. It was planned as a railway from Levin, via an upgrade of the tramway, to Bulls and Greatford, via Foxton. There had also been a request in 1878 to lay a tramway across the railway at Greatford and, in 1883, a plan of a tramway from Greatford to the Rangitīkei River.

Gravel pit 
It was a short siding, also known as Kakariki Ballast Pit and had been used as a source of railway ballast from 1888, despite the objections of its landowners.

Station structures 
When the station opened it had no waiting room. On 20 March 1878 a contract had been signed with J & C Bull for station buildings, which were completed by 5 August 1879. It seems that the 5th class station built at Halcombe was moved to Greatford, when a much larger station replaced it in 1878. In 1887 a telephone replaced a Morse telegraph and, by 1896, there was a 5th class station, passenger platform, cart approach to platform,  by  goods shed, cattle yards, water service, stationmaster's house, urinals and a passing loop for 27 wagons. In 1897 a loading bank and crane were added and the approach road widened, and in 1898 sheep yards were built. On 19 February 1917 the goods shed burnt down. From 1878 to 1968 there was a Post Office at the station. In 1963 two 7½-ton electric gantries were built to handle concrete products.

Closure 
In 1966 the sheep yards were reduced and then closed on 6 March 1972, when they were sold and removed. In 1980 all that remained was a high-level loading bank and a loop for 48 wagons. On Sunday 27 March 1983 the station closed to all traffic.

Incidents 
An engine and three trucks overturned when they derailed on the points at the station in 1925. A similar derailment occurred a year earlier.

References

External links
 1902 photo of a truck of flax from L D Smith, worth £400, awaiting transport at Greatford
 1938 photo of track realignment between Greatford and Kakariki
2010 photo of steam train climbing Greatford bank
2013 video of Northern Explorer on Kakariki bank
2015 video of train between Greatford and Marton

Defunct railway stations in New Zealand
Buildings and structures in Manawatū-Whanganui
Rail transport in Manawatū-Whanganui
Railway stations opened in 1878
Railway stations closed in 1983